2018–19 Iran Football's 2nd Division  is the 18th under 2nd Division since its establishment (current format) in 2001. The season featured 21 teams from the 2nd Division 2017–18, three new teams relegated from the 2017–18 Azadegan League: Saba Qom, Rah Ahan Tehran and Iranjavan Boushehr, and four new teams promoted from the 3rd Division 2017–18: Chooka Talesh, Shahrdari Kamyaran, Esteghlal Ramshir, Jahad Nasr Sirjan.

Teams

Stadia and locations

Number of teams by region

League table

Group A

Group B

2nd Division  Play-off

Leg 1

Leg 2 

source=

2nd Division  Final

Leg 1

References
Iran Football's 2nd Division 2nd Division 2018-19

League 2 (Iran) seasons
3